Maurive Protin (1 May 1899 – 11 March 1994) was a Belgian racing cyclist. He rode in the 1923 Tour de France.

References

1899 births
1994 deaths
Belgian male cyclists
Place of birth missing